AEV may refer to:

 Aboitiz Equity Ventures, a holding company which controls the Aboitiz Group conglomerate, created by Jon Ramon Aboitiz
 Alternative energy vehicle, a type of automobile
 American Expedition Vehicles, a manufacturer of off-road and overland vehicle and parts
 Armored engineering vehicle, or military engineering vehicle
 Atlanta Esports Ventures, an American venture capital firm
 Autonomous and electric vehicle, electric self-driving vehicles

See also
 
 AE (disambiguation)
 EV (disambiguation)